Molinos District is one of thirty-four districts of the province Jauja in Peru.

See also 
 Uqsha Mach'ay

References